Jennifer Pett-Ridge is an American biologist who is a senior staff scientist at the Lawrence Livermore National Laboratory. She also serves as an adjunct professor at the University of California, Merced. Her research makes use of systems biology and geochemistry to uncover function in microbial communities. She was awarded a 2021 United States Department of Energy Ernest Orlando Lawrence Award.

Early life and education 
Pett-Ridge studied biology at Yale University. She moved to the Yale School of the Environment for graduate studies, and specialized in forest science. She worked as a forest service technician at the Hubbard Brook Experimental Forest. After earning her master's degree, Pett-Ridge joined the University of California, Berkeley for her doctoral research. Her research considered how fluctuating redox regimes impact the ecology of microbial communities. She was appointed a postdoctoral fellow at the Lawrence Livermore National Laboratory and vice chair of soil ecology at the Ecological Society of America.

Research and career 
Pett-Ridge served as lead scientist for the science focus area on Genomic Science. In 2018, Pett-Ridge was appointed lead of the soil microbiome focus area, in which she oversees the LLML Carbon Uptake pillar of the Carbon Initiative. Pett-Ridge has worked in microbial ecology in an effort to understand and predict future climates. She developed isotopic tools (typically C and N isotope composition) and imaging to quantify how climate influences the health of soil, microorganisms and plants. She was supported by a United States Department of Energy Early Career award to investigate how soil microbial communities responded to climate change. In particular, she developed nanoscale secondary ion mass spectrometry.

Pett-Ridge has investigated whether it is possible to sequester carbon dioxide using plants like switchgrass. The roots of switchgrass (Panicum virgatum) can extend 50 feet down, which can contribute to carbon sequestration by locking carbon deep into ground.

In 2020, Pett-Ridge was appointed lead for Sustainability in the Center for Advanced Bioenergy and Bioproducts Innovation (CABBI).

Awards and honors 
 2019 Geochemical Society Endowed Biogeochemistry Lecture
 2021 United States Department of Energy Ernest Orlando Lawrence Award

Select publications

References

Living people
Year of birth missing (living people)
American women biologists
21st-century American biologists
University of California, Merced faculty
Yale School of Forestry & Environmental Studies alumni
Lawrence Livermore National Laboratory staff
American ecologists
21st-century American women scientists